StarMax may refer to :

 Motorola StarMax, Apple Macintosh clones
 Starmax, a South Korean DVD distributor